The Gibraltar men's national field hockey team represents Gibraltar in international men's field hockey and is controlled by Gibraltar Hockey.

Competitive record
Gibraltar has never qualified for the Summer Olympics or the World Cup. They have however participated once in the European championship, in 1978 where they finished 12th out of 12.

European championships

Hockey World League and FIH Series

*Draws include matches decided on a penalty shoot-out.

References

European men's national field hockey teams
National team
Field hockey men